Richard Anthony Cooper (born 1947), Master of St Benet's Hall, Oxford, from September 2018 until September 2022, is Emeritus Professor of French in the Faculty of Medieval and Modern Languages at Oxford University.

Cooper is also an Emeritus Fellow of Brasenose College, Oxford and former Chairman of the Faculty Board of Modern Languages of the University of Oxford.

Career
Educated at Manchester Grammar School, introduced by Donald Adamson to foreign languages, Cooper went up to New College, Oxford where he read French and Italian.

Cooper taught French at the University of Lancaster from 1971, before returning to Oxford in 1977 as a tutor in French at Brasenose College, before being appointed Reader in 1996 and subsequently Professor in 1998.  He is a member of the Académie des Sciences, Belles Lettres et Arts and of the Institut des Sciences de l'Homme, Lyon.

Professor Cooper was selected as a torchbearer for the 2012 Summer Olympics Torch Relay, reflecting his 40 years of service to sport at the Oxford University, including 15 years as Chairman of the University Sports Committee.

Honours

Appointed Officier dans l'ordre des Palmes Académiques in 1996 (promoted Commandeur in 2012), Cooper also became Commendatore dell'Ordine al Merito della Repubblica Italiana in 2003.

Selected publications
 Rabelais et l'Italie (1991)
 Litteræ in tempore belli: Études sur les relations littéraires italo-françaises pendant les guerres d'Italie (1997)
 Maurice Scève: The Entry of Henri II into Lyon, September 1548, text with an introduction and notes (1997)
 Rabelais, Gargantua and Pantagruel, trans. Sir Thomas Urquhart (1999)
 Contributor: Jean du Bellay, Poemata, with G. Demerson (2007)
 Chrétiens et mondains, poèmes épars: vol. 8 of Œuvres complètes de Marguerite de Navarre (2007).

References

External links
 www.mod-langs.ox.ac.uk
 www.bnc.ox.ac.uk

1947 births
Living people
People educated at Manchester Grammar School
Alumni of New College, Oxford
Academics of Lancaster University
Linguists from the United Kingdom
Fellows of Brasenose College, Oxford
Academics of the University of Oxford
Commandeurs of the Ordre des Palmes Académiques
Commanders of the Order of Merit of the Italian Republic
Masters of St Benet's Hall, Oxford